Stephen Frears is an English director and producer. He has directed numerous acclaimed feature films since his debut in the early 1980s, such as My Beautiful Laundrette (1985), Dangerous Liaisons (1988), The Grifters (1990), High Fidelity (2000), The Queen (2006), Philomena (2013), Florence Foster Jenkins (2016), and Victoria & Abdul (2017). He has received two nominations for the Academy Award for Best Director.

Frears is also known for his work on various television programs, including Fail Safe (2000), The Deal (2003), Muhammad Ali's Greatest Fight (2013), A Very English Scandal (2018), State of the Union (2019), and Quiz (2020). He has received four Primetime Emmy Award nominations, with one win.

In 2008, The Daily Telegraph named Frears among the 100 most influential people in British culture.

Major Awards

Academy Awards

Primetime Emmy Awards

Golden Globe Awards

British Academy Film Awards

British Academy Television Awards

Other Awards

Directors Guild of America Awards

Independent Spirit Awards

César Awards

British Independent Film Awards

Evening Standard Film Awards

London Film Critics' Circle

Festival Awards

Berlin Film Festival

Cannes Film Festival

Venice Film Festival

Toronto Film Festival

References 

Frears, Stephen